PRE-084 is a sigma receptor agonist, selective for the σ1 subtype. It has nootropic and antidepressant actions in animal studies, as well as antitussive and reinforcing effects. PRE-084 increases the expression of GDNF.

Synthesis

Sodium hydride mediated alkylation between Benzyl cyanide (1) and 1,5-dibromopentane [111-24-0] (2) gives 1-phenylcyclohexanecarbonitrile [2201-23-2] (3). Hydrolysis of the nitrile by treatment with aqueous potassium hydroxide in DEG gives 1-phenylcyclohexanecarboxylic acid [1135-67-7] (4). Halogenation with thionyl chloride gives 1-phenylcyclohexanecarbonyl chloride [2890-42-8]. This intermediate was not isolated but reacted with 2-morpholinoethanol [622-40-2] (5) to give the ester and hence, completing the synthesis of PRE084 (6).

References

Sigma agonists
Carboxylate esters
4-Morpholinyl compunds